The Downing Street director of communications is the post of director of communications for the prime minister of the United Kingdom. The position is held by an appointed special adviser.

In September 2022, as part of the incoming Truss ministry, the role was sub-divided into a political and non-political remit, with Adam Jones becoming the political director of communications and Simon McGee the director of government communications.

The role sub-division was abolished during the Sunak ministry.

History 
The position of Downing Street Director of Communications was created in 2000. The first holder of the position was Alastair Campbell who had previously served as the Downing Street press secretary and as the prime minister's official spokesperson. The position initially held the power to issue orders to civil servants, but this authority was removed after Campbell's departure in 2003.

The post was temporarily vacant from April to July 2017 following the resignation of the former director of communications, Katie Perrior.

List of Directors of Communications

In popular culture 
In television series The Thick of It, the Downing Street director of communications was portrayed by actor Peter Capaldi playing the now infamous Malcolm Tucker. Former special advisors (spads) and civil servants were called upon to make the series as close-to-reality as possible. In 2009, Capaldi stated "Malcolm Tucker is Alastair Campbell. But Mandelson is there, too."

See also 
 Downing Street Press Secretary

References 

British Prime Minister's Office
10 Downing Street